Elections to Kingston upon Thames Council were held on 4 May 2006.  The whole council was up for election and the Liberal Democrats held overall control, the first time any political party has retained control of the council since 1982.

Election result

|}

Ward results

Alexandra

Berrylands

Beverley

Canbury

Chessington North and Hook

Chessington South

Coombe Hill

Coombe Vale

Grove

Norbiton

Old Malden

St James

St Mark's

Surbiton Hill

Tolworth and Hook Rise

Tudor

References

2006
2006 London Borough council elections